WQOF (1260 AM) is a commercial radio station licensed to Washington, D.C., and serving the Washington metro area.  The station is owned and operated by Relevant Radio and broadcasts its nationally syndicated Catholic talk and teaching programming.

WQOF operates with 35,000 watts during the day and 5,000 watts at night.  Its transmitter is off Brookville Road in Silver Spring, Maryland.

History

1260 kHz was the original home of WOL, which signed on in 1928.  WOL was the Washington affiliate of the Mutual Broadcasting System during radio's "golden age" and fed the Fulton Lewis Jr. nightly newscast to the network.

WOL made a programming and call sign swap with AM 1450 WWDC on February 20, 1950.  That landed the WWDC call letters on 1260 AM for the rest of the century. During the 1960s, radio personalities such as Jimmy Dean and Fred Fiske had programs on this station. The format was middle-of-the-road. It staked out a place in radio and music history by being the first American radio station to play a Beatles song when it aired "I Want to Hold Your Hand" in December 1963.

During the 1970s, WWDC was a moderately popular Top 40 station. In 1981, the station began to simulcast of the morning and afternoon drive shows on sister FM Rock station WWDC-FM ("DC101"), with separate shows and the same music format during other dayparts. In 1984, it broke off the simulcast completely and became an adult standards station.

WWDC changed its call letters to WGAY in 1999, following the dropping of the long-time beautiful music format that was WGAY-FM (which became WJMO-FM and then WIHT). WGAY kept its adult standards format nonetheless until Clear Channel Communications bought the station with the AMFM merger in 2000. On April 2, 2001, the standards format was dropped, and the business news format and WWRC callsign were moved from 570 AM to 1260 AM. It thus inherited the legacy of another heritage Washington station, which had originally been on 980 AM before changing dial positions with WTEM in 1992. Still, there were difficulties finding a format for the station that was different from the other Clear Channel stations in the Washington metropolitan area.

Until 2005, the station carried the business talk format, a full-time audio relay of CNN Headline News, and sports talk programming (as "Sports Talk 1260", a supplement to sister station WTEM), then switched to progressive talk and became an Air America Radio affiliate. Hosts under the station's progressive talk format included Lionel, Stephanie Miller, Ed Schultz, Bill Press, Rachel Maddow and Ron Reagan.

While the progressive format suffered from low ratings (The Washington Post reported its ratings in December 2006 as being "an almost imperceptible audience"), WWRC booked a .4 rating in summer 2008 and a .1 rating in winter 2008.

Red Zebra Broadcasting purchased WTNT, WTEM and WWRC from Clear Channel in a deal announced in 2008.

On September 15, 2008, WWRC was branded as "Obama 1260" while maintaining its progressive talk format, plus news coverage from CNN and CNBC. The temporary branding was a stunt coinciding with conservative-oriented sister station WTNT's own rebranding as "McCain 570", and was expected to last throughout the 2008 presidential election. While WTNT was re-branded "Freedom 570" right after the election, WWRC retained its Obama 1260 branding beyond Illinois senator Barack Obama's Presidential inauguration on January 20, 2009.

The Washington Post reported on February 2, 2009, that WWRC would be changing to a business talk format the following week (although the Ed Schultz Show was moved to sister station WTNT, he would eventually be dropped from that station's lineup). Starting on February 9, 2009, WWRC broadcast a syndicated business talk format under the brand, "Money 1260." Chiefly an outlet for the Business Talk Radio Network, the station also carried Ray Lucia and Clark Howard.

WWRC was sold to Salem Communications in April 2010. Upon taking control on May 15 (initially via a local marketing agreement before completing its purchase on August 3), Salem relaunched the station with its conservative talk format, again reviving the "WRC" branding as "1260 WRC."

Prior to Salem's purchase of WWRC, the station aired Washington Redskins and Notre Dame football games as an affiliate station. WWRC also had carried sports broadcasts dislodged from WTEM and WTNT by schedule conflicts.

In late October 2014, WWRC carried a series of promos alluding to a rebranding to occur after the 2014 midterm elections. The rebranding took place on November 4, 2014, with the station taking Salem's common major-market branding of "The Answer" as "1260 The Answer", though no personalities were shifted around or removed.

On November 20, 2017, Salem moved the talk programming, "Answer" branding, and WWRC callsign to 570 AM (the former WSPZ), which they had purchased from Red Zebra Broadcasting the prior May. The station spent two weeks airing a loop identifying itself as WSPZ and directing listeners to 570 AM. WSPZ then relayed the programming of Salem's WAVA-FM as a placeholder. A sale to Immaculate Heart Media was announced on March 25, 2019, at a purchase price of $750,000; the sale was consummated on May 14, 2019, with the call sign changed to WQOF on the same day.

References

External links

FCC History Cards for WQOF (covering as )

QOF
Radio stations established in 1928
1928 establishments in Maryland
Relevant Radio stations